The Indianapolis Inferno was a Tier III Junior B ice hockey team located in Indianapolis, Indiana. The team was a member of the Great Lakes Junior Hockey League. The team played their home games at the 1,200-seat Pan American Arena at the Pan Am Plaza in downtown Indianapolis. The league switched to inline hockey in 2012 and the team never joined a new league.

History
The franchise was previously known as the Danville Inferno and played at the David S. Palmer Arena in Danville, Illinois. By the beginning of the 2010–11 season the Inferno had over 20 alumni playing in either Tier III Jr.  or higher levels as well as playing in college from the NCAA D-3 to ACHA D-2 levels.

Regular season records

Playoff records

External links
 Inferno Website

Sports teams in Indianapolis
Ice hockey teams in Indiana
Defunct ice hockey teams in the United States
2010 establishments in Indiana
Ice hockey clubs established in 2010
Ice hockey clubs disestablished in 2012
2012 disestablishments in Indiana